Eduardo Niño García (born 8 August 1967) is a retired Colombian football goalkeeper. He was born in Bogota, and started his career playing for Independiente Santa Fe, and was then transferred to América de Cali. He later became goalkeeping coach at Millonarios. He is currently the goalkeeping coach for the Colombia national football team as well as for Primera Division Liga Aguila Side: Deportivo Cali

References

1967 births
Living people
Free University of Colombia alumni
Footballers from Bogotá
Association football goalkeepers
Colombian footballers
Colombian expatriate footballers
Independiente Santa Fe footballers
América de Cali footballers
Botafogo de Futebol e Regatas players
Unión Magdalena footballers
Millonarios F.C. players
Categoría Primera A players
Colombian expatriate sportspeople in Brazil
Expatriate footballers in Brazil
Colombia under-20 international footballers
Colombia international footballers
1989 Copa América players
1990 FIFA World Cup players
1991 Copa América players
Association football goalkeeping coaches